Silvër Horizon is the sixth studio album of Finnish melodic heavy metal band Diablo. It was released in Finland 18 September 2015 and in Central Europe 30 October 2015.

The album made it to No. 1 in Finnish official charts for the week 39/2015 as Mimic 47 did in year 2006. The albums Icaros and Eternium also went to top 3 back when they were released.

There was seven years between this and previous album of Diablo, Icaros, which was released in May 2008. The Songs of Silver Horizon were composed and their lyrics were written in the same order they are listed in the album. The story that develops through the songs is loosely based on the sci-fi book Aniara written by Harry Martinson.

Track listing
Composition and lyrics: Marko Utriainen and Rainer Nygård, unless otherwise stated.

Credits 
 Heikki Malmberg – Drums
 Rainer Nygård – Rhythm guitar, Vocals
 Marko Utriainen – Lead guitar
 Aadolf Virtanen – Bass, Backing vocals'
 Keijo Niinimaa, Samu Oittinen, Markku Kivistö, Tuomo Saikkonen, Kuisma aalto, Niko Rauhala – Backing vocals
 Jenna-Miia Kaivosoja – Backing vocals on track 10
 Ekaterina "Lucky" Andryushina – Female voice on track 1
 Erkki Seppänen – Male voice on tracks 9 and 10
 Samu Oittinen – Recording, mixing
 Mika Jussila – Engineer
 Miikka Tikka – Design
 Harri Hinkka – Photography

2015 albums
Diablo (band) albums